Loch Achanalt is a small, irregularly shaped, lowland freshwater loch in Ross and Cromarty in the Scottish Highlands, close to Achanalt railway station and the village of Achanalt. The River Bran flows into the loch on its western shore, and at its eastern shore there is a short fast stream draining into Loch a' Chuilinn. The loch was surveyed on 9 August 1902 by R.M. Clarke and James Murray as part of Sir John Murray's Bathymetrical Survey of Fresh-Water Lochs of Scotland 1897–1909.

The Loch-class frigate  was named after the loch.

References 

Achanalt
Achanalt